Zosteropoda elevata is a moth of the family Noctuidae. It is found in northern South America, including Colombia.

References 

Hadeninae
Moths described in 1924